John Kaplan may refer to:

 John Kaplan (cantor), American cantor
 John Kaplan (law professor) (1929–1989), legal scholar and law professor
 John Kaplan (photographer), American photographer

See also
 Jon Kaplan (disambiguation)
 Jonathan Kaplan (disambiguation)